EJT may refer to:
 Eclipse Aviation, defunct American aircraft manufacturer
 Enejit Airport, Marshall Islands
 European Journal of Theology